The Astana Metro is an incomplete light rail rapid transit system located in Astana, Kazakhstan, which is the capital of the country with a population of over 1,000,000. Construction should have finished roughly about the same time as the Almaty Metro, which was estimated for 2010. However, completion has been postponed several times, in 2011 completion was scheduled to coincide with the Expo in 2017 and as of October 2017 the first stage is planned to be commissioned in December 2019. Project authority Astana LRT LLP signed an agreement with a consortium of China Railway International Group and Beijing State-Owned Assets Management Co for construction of the first phase of the capital’s light rail project on May 7, 2015. Construction began in May 2017.

The light metro is part of Nazarbayev's Kazakhstan 2030 economic plan to transform Kazakhstan into an economic power.

Video renders of the proposed system show the lines built on viaducts running adjacent to roads, with enclosed stations offering heating and ventilation systems to protect passengers from the extreme weather variations in the city.

The Chinese company constructing the project went bankrupt early 2019. The city hall ordered an indefinite halt to it. Since then, the half-built remnants of the project have become a prominent symbol of corruption within the country.

Line 1
The  North-South route would link Nursultan Nazarbayev International Airport with Astana Nurly Zhol railway station via the modern "Left Bank" area of the city centre. The line will have 18 stops and one depot. Capacity is estimated to be 146,000 people per day.

Further phases
Original plans show further phases to link other areas of the city.

In popular culture 
A scene in a music video by Kazakhstani rap group  features a man in a suit, meant to be a politician, handing a Lego set labeled "Nur-Sultan LRT" to a child, only for it to contain unfinished concrete pillars.

References

Transport in Astana
Underground rapid transit in Kazakhstan
Proposed public transport in Asia
Tram and light rail transit systems under construction